Craig A. Gagnon (born August 2, 1960) is an American politician. He is a member of the South Carolina House of Representatives from the 11th District, serving since 2013. He is a member of the Republican party.

References

Living people
1960 births
Republican Party members of the South Carolina House of Representatives
Politicians from Lowell, Massachusetts
21st-century American politicians